Rob Brouwer (born December 10, 1982) is a Canadian rugby union player who currently plays for the Toronto Arrows of Major League Rugby (MLR).

Early life
Brouwer was born in Lindsay, Ontario, Canada and spent much of his early years working on the family farm and didn't start playing rugby until Grade 12 in high school. The position that Brouwer plays is Prop.

Rugby career

On November 6, 2018, he signed with the Toronto Arrows for the 2019 Major League Rugby season after previously playing for the Arrows in their exhibition season in 2018.

References 

Living people
Toronto Arrows players
1982 births
Rugby union props
Canadian rugby union players
Canada international rugby union players